Cyrtodactylus tautbatorum is a species of gecko, a lizard in the family Gekkonidae. The species is endemic to Palawan in the Philippines.

Etymology
The specific name, tautbatorum, is in honor of the Tau't-Bato peoples.

Description
C. tautbatorum is a small species for its genus. It has a dorsal pattern of transverse body bands which have a "bow-tie" shape. Similar species have transverse body bands which have a "dumbbell" shape.

References

Further reading
Welton LJ, Siler CD, Diesmos AC, Brown RM (2009). "A new bent-toed gecko (genus Cyrtodactylus) from southern Palawan Island, Philippines and clarification of the taxonomic status of C. annulatus ". Herpetologica 65 (3): 328–343. (Cyrtodactylus tautbatorum, new species).

Cyrtodactylus
Reptiles described in 2009